St. Aubin (Jèrriais: Saint Aubîn) is a town and port in St. Brelade in Jersey, the largest of the Channel Islands. It is located on the western end of St. Aubin's Bay, on the south coast of the island, opening out into the Gulf of Saint-Malo. 

St. Aubin was originally a fishing village and the historic economic centre of the island. The Jersey Railway historically terminated in the town, at what is now the parish hall. The Railway Walk, a trail following the route of the former Jersey Railway to La Corbière, starts from St Aubin.

The town is the civil administrative centre for the parish of St. Brelade, however ecclesiastically, the parish church is located in St. Brelade's Bay. It retains a much more historic character than St. Helier, whose architecture has changed as the centre of Jersey's finance industry.

Toponymy
Its name refers to Saint Aubin, the 6th Century C.E. bishop of Angers, and may reflect the name of a long-disappeared chapel.

The town has been referred to various as a town or a village. In Jersey, "town" is generally used as slang for the largest town on the island, St. Helier.

History
At the beginning of the 17th century, there was no quay in or road to St Aubin. At this time all the homes in the town were on the hillsides or up Mont les Vaux. In 1648, the States ordered the construction of a pier, however there was still no road to the island's capital.

Although St. Helier seems to have always been the Bailiwick's administrative capital and held the island's major market, St. Aubin was historically the centre for international trade, particularly during the Newfoundland cod-fishery. This is because it was the only large port on the island. St. Helier only had a small quay until 1840, however after the development of the St. Helier harbours, it displaced St. Aubin as the major trading post.

In 1844, the road between St. Helier and La Haule (St Aubin's Road) was finished. That same year, the road between La Haule and St. Aubin opened too, finally connecting St. Aubin to the island's larger town.

In the 19th century, the town of St. Helier experienced a large amount of growth due to the industrialisation of the island and immigration from France and England. St. Aubin did not follow the same pattern of growth, being constrained by its hilly geography.

Climate
Saint Aubin enjoys a relatively warm version of temperate Oceanic climate (Cfb) with mild temperatures year round and rare negative extremes. There are relatively low precipitations, nearly all in form of rain or mist (843 mm/annum). There are four seasons with wet and mild winter starting in early December and ending in the beginning of March, changing into much sunnier and warmer spring which ends during May. Local summer, sunny, warm and quite dry, then continues up to its end in the course of September. Autumn, rapidly cooling and wetter lasts into the end of November.

Landmarks
St. Aubin's Fort lies in the bay on a tidal island, just outside the harbour. This fort is accessible on foot, at a low tide, via a causeway that runs from the road just in front of the Royal Channel Islands Yacht Club. The fort features a tower keep that is surrounded by granite walls and ramparts. During the German occupation of the Channel Islands, the German forces added bunkers and other features to the fort.

The Anglican church of St Aubin on the Hill is located uphill from the harbour. There is also a Catholic church, the Sacred Heart Church.

References

External links

Ports and harbours of Jersey
Saint Brélade